The Marshall Capital (later sold as the MCV Capital) was a single-decker bus body built originally by Marshall Bus between 1996 and 2002, and later by MCV Bus & Coach between 2002 and 2003. Initially launched on the step-entrance MAN 11.220 and then Iveco Eurorider chassis, the Capital found greater success after being launched on the low-floor Dennis Dart SLF chassis from 1997. Marshall also produced a related, integral midibus, known as the Marshall Minibus, between 1996 and 1998.

The vast majority of Capitals – more than 800 examples – were bodied on the Dennis Dart SLF chassis. Key design features of the Capital include the double-curvature windscreen, arched top with a separately mounted destination display, and peaked roof dome.

Production of the Capital passed to MCV in 2002 after Marshall entered administration. In 2003, when the newly formed TransBus International decided not to supply Dart SLF chassis to MCV, the Capital was replaced by the MCV Stirling body on MAN chassis.

Variants

Marshall C43
Developed from the Marshall C37, the step-entrance Marshall C43 was the first variant of the Capital to be launched, based on high-floor MAN 11.220 chassis as with its predecessor. In total, 33 C43 Capitals were produced between 1996 and 1999, including one unregistered prototype.

R&I Tours of London (later taken over by MTL London) took delivery of the first C43 in April 1996, and between them R&I and MTL were the largest customer for the variant, taking delivery of 24 examples up until January 1997. Dart Buses of Paisley were the second-largest customer, ordering six C43s, including the final example to be produced in January 1999. Two C43s were purchased by Shalder of Scalloway, and one by Thamesdown Transport.

Marshall C39
The low-floor Marshall C39, commonly referred to simply as the Marshall Capital, was launched on Dennis Dart SLF in 1997, with the first three examples entering service with independent operators in March 1997. Between 1997 and 2002, 846 C39 Capitals were produced, making it by far the most successful variant of the Capital and one of the most successful buses in the United Kingdom market at the turn of the millennium.

The most significant customer for the C39 was First London, who purchased more than 400 for its CentreWest, Capital and London Buslines fleets. After retirement from service in London, many were cascaded to other FirstGroup subsidiaries.

MTL purchased 76 C39s for its London operations - all of which passed to Metroline in 1998 - as well as 75 for its Merseyside fleet. Other notable customers were London Central, Halton Transport, Warrington Borough Transport and Isle of Man Transport. The final Marshall-bodied C39 entered service with First Capital in September 2002.

Marshall Minibus
An integral version of the low-floor Capital, based on Marshall's own chassis, was launched in 1996 branded as the Marshall Minibus. The Minibus was a pioneering design as one of the UK's first low-floor midibuses, although it is ultimately considered to be a general failure due to low sales – just 36 were produced – and poor reliability.

The first four Minibuses entered service in August 1996 with independent operators. London General placed the first sizeable order, for 15 examples, delivered between September 1996 and January 1997. This was followed by a slightly larger order from CentreWest for 16 examples, which were delivered between November 1997 and July 1998. The Minibus was largely superseded by the launch of the C39 Capital on Dennis' more reliable Dart SLF chassis in 1997, although the final two Minibuses were not produced until May 2001, entering service with Avon Buses.

Marshall Euro
In 1998, an experimental version of the step-entrance C43 Capital body, known as the Marshall Euro, was launched on Iveco Eurorider 391E chassis, which at the time had previously only been available in the United Kingdom market as a coach chassis. The Euro was much longer than other variants of the Capital, offering a seating capacity of up to 51. However, the unusual Iveco/Marshall full-size high-floor bus combination proved unsuccessful, and only three Euros were produced; one bus for Whitelaw of Stonehouse, and two as custom-built mobile treatment centres for St John Ambulance.

MCV Capital
When Marshall Bus entered administration in late 2002, MCV Bus & Coach bought the design for the C39 Capital body and production continued as the MCV Capital. However, only five MCV Capitals were produced for Warrington Borough Transport in early 2003 before TransBus International decided to cease supplying Dart SLF chassis to MCV. The Capital was succeeded by the MCV Stirling on MAN chassis in late 2003.

References

External links

Buses of the United Kingdom
Low-floor buses
Midibuses
Step-entrance buses
Vehicles introduced in 1996